King Bee is the fourteenth and final studio album by blues singer and guitarist Muddy Waters. Released in 1981, it is third in a series of records done for the label Blue Sky Records under producer/guitarist Johnny Winter. Recorded in three days (and in the wake of Muddy's failing health) some of the band members, namely Winter and guitarist Bob Margolin, were not happy with the result. As his health deteriorated, Muddy was forced to cancel an increasing number of shows. He died of a heart attack on April 30, 1983.

The album was recorded in May 1980. A salary dispute between the band and Muddy Waters's manager, Scott Cameron, halted the session. Eventually the album was completed by using a couple of outtakes from 1977's Hard Again.

David Michael Kennedy was the photographer for the King Bee album, providing photos for the front cover, back cover, and the inside album sleeve.  The photo for the inside album sleeve was a picture of Muddy and his large family sitting in the living room of his home in Westmont, Illinois, which is a western suburb of Chicago.

Track listing 
All songs written by McKinley Morganfield, unless noted otherwise.

 "I'm A King Bee" (James Moore) – 3:49 
 "Too Young to Know" – 4:28
 "Mean Old Frisco Blues" (Arthur Crudup) – 3:44 
 "Forever Lonely" – 4:33
 "I Feel Like Going Home" – 3:42
 "Champagne & Reefer" – 4:36
 "Sad Sad Day" – 5:22
 "(My Eyes) Keep Me in Trouble" (Hap Walker) – 3:16 
 "Deep Down in Florida #2" (James Burke Oden) – 4:06 
 "No Escape from the Blues" (Charles Williams) – 2:04

Personnel 
Muddy Waters – vocals, guitar
Bob Margolin – guitar
Pinetop Perkins – piano
James Cotton – harmonica on "Deep Down in Florida" and "Clouds in My Heart"
Jerry Portnoy – harmonica
Willie "Big Eyes" Smith – drums
Charles Calmese – bass on "Deep Down in Florida" and "Clouds in My Heart"
Calvin Jones – bass
Johnny Winter – guitar, producer

References 

1981 albums
Muddy Waters albums
Albums produced by Johnny Winter
Blue Sky Records albums